Králík (or Králik, or Kralik) means "rabbit" in Czech. It may refer to:

Csaba Králik (born 1992), Slovak football midfielder of Hungarian ethnicity
František Králík (1942–1974), Czechoslovak handball player
Jan Králík (born 1987), Czech footballer
Jean-Louis Kralik (1813–1892), French botanist
Jiří Králík (born 1952), Czechoslovak ice hockey player
Juraj Králik (born 1926), Slovak diplomat and writer
Martin Králik (born 1995), Slovak footballer
Mathilde Kralik (1857–1944), Austrian composer
Zachary Kralik, fictional vampire in the Buffyverse

See also
Králíky
Králiky
Kalik

Surnames from nicknames